Inchi Inchi Prem (released 2013) is a Bangladeshi film directed Raju Chowdhury and starring Bappy Chowdhury and Bobby.

Plot

Cast
 Bappy Chowdhury as Shuvo
 Bobby as Megha
 Srabon as Akash
 Sathiya Jahid as Nila
 Sohel Khan as Sadek Chowdhury
 Gangua as Anayet
 Rebeka Rouf as Shuvo's Mother
 Rina Khan
 DJ Shohel as 
 Chikon Ali as Bacchu
 Afzal Sharif as Shior Ali

Response

Film critic Sadia Khalid, writing for The Daily Star, praised Bobby's wardrobe, but gave the movie only one star out of a possible five, saying "This film is bound to let her audiences down". The Dhaka Tribune described it as a commercial failure.

References

2013 films
2013 action films
2013 romantic drama films
Bengali-language Bangladeshi films
Bangladeshi action films
Bangladeshi romantic drama films
2010s Bengali-language films